Mid-term parliamentary elections were held in Cuba on 1 November 1932 in order to fill half the seats in the House of Representatives. The Liberal Party was the biggest winner, taking 35 of the 69 seats.

Results

References

Cuba
Parliamentary elections in Cuba
1932 in Cuba
November 1932 events in North America
Election and referendum articles with incomplete results